Istgah-e-Cham Sanger (also Romanized as Īstgāh-e-Cham Sanger; also known as Cham Shekar and Cham Sangar) is a village in Chamsangar Rural District, Papi District, Khorramabad County, Lorestan Province, Iran. At the 2006 census, its population was 515, in 103 families.

References 

Towns and villages in Khorramabad County